Ismet Osmani (born 21 December 2000) is a Swiss professional footballer who plays as a midfielder for German club Heeslinger SC.

Career statistics

Club

Notes

References

2000 births
Swiss people of Macedonian descent
People from Liestal
Sportspeople from Basel-Landschaft
Living people
Swiss men's footballers
Association football midfielders
FC Concordia Basel players
SC Austria Lustenau players
SV Muttenz players
KF Bylis players
BSV Schwarz-Weiß Rehden players
Austrian Regionalliga players
2. Liga (Austria) players
Swiss 1. Liga (football) players
Kategoria e Parë players
Regionalliga players
Oberliga (football) players
Swiss expatriate footballers
Swiss expatriate sportspeople in Austria
Expatriate footballers in Austria
Swiss expatriate sportspeople in Albania
Expatriate footballers in Albania
Swiss expatriate sportspeople in Germany
Expatriate footballers in Germany